= Riches Island Formation =

- Stratigraphic range: Early Ordovician – Late Ordovician
- Type: Formation
- Unit of: Baie d'Espoir Group

Lithology
- Primary: Marine siliciclastic shales

Location
- Region: Newfoundland
- Country: Canada
- Occurrence of the Riches Island Formation in southeastern Newfoundland

The Riches Island Formation is a formation cropping out in Newfoundland.
